Below are the squads selected for the football tournament at the 1971 Mediterranean Games hosted in the city of Izmir in Turkey, which took place on 6–16 October 1971.

The teams were national Under-20 sides.

Group A

France

Syria

Tunisia

Turkey

Group B

Egypt

Greece

Morocco

Yugoslavia
Head coach:

References

Squads
Mediterranean Games football squads